Chris Carter may refer to:

Music
 Chris Carter (American musician) (born 1959), producer of Mayor of the Sunset Strip and host of Breakfast With The Beatles
 Chris Carter (British musician) (born 1953), founding member of Throbbing Gristle
 Chris Carter or Von Pimpenstein, American record producer and mixer

Sports

American football
 Chris Carter (defensive back) (born 1974), American football safety
 Chris Carter (linebacker) (born 1989), American football linebacker
 Cris Carter (born 1965), American football Hall of Fame wide receiver
 Chris Carter (wide receiver) (born 1987), American football wide receiver

Other sports
 Chris Carter (middle-distance runner) (born 1942), British middle-distance runner
 Chris Carter (outfielder) (born 1982), American former baseball right fielder
 Chris Carter (infielder) (born 1986), American baseball first baseman/designated hitter
 Chris Carter (triple jumper) (born 1989), American triple jumper

Other uses
 Chris Carter (screenwriter) (born 1956), American television screenwriter and producer who created The X-Files
 Chris Carter (actor) (born 1985), Canadian television screenwriter and actor
 Chris Carter (politician) (born 1952), New Zealand politician and former cabinet minister
 Chris Carter III (born 1981), Missouri state representative

See also 
 Christopher Carter (disambiguation)
 Carter (name)